Zoran Dukić (born 1969 in Zagreb) is a Croatian classical guitarist. Between 1990 and 1997, Dukić won more competitions than any other guitarist had at the time.

Life

He started to play the guitar at the age of six. He graduated from the Music Academy of Zagreb with Darko Petrinjak and completed his studies with Hubert Käppel at the Hochschule für Music in Cologne, Germany.

He teaches at the Koninklijk Conservatorium in The Hague and is a visiting artist at Royal Welsh College of Music & Drama. He was previously on faculty at the Escola Superior de Música de Catalunya in Barcelona as well as the Hochschule für Musik in Aachen.

Serbian guitarist Sabrina Vlaškalić studied with Dukic at the Royal Conservatory of the Hague. She said his teaching focused on auditory rather than technical skills. He would have her listen and then imitate the subtle differences in the performances of Julian Bream or Ida Presti.

Recordings

Bach-Piazzolla (GC04ZOR-17, GuitarCoop) - Recording: 2017
Balkan Muses (GHA 126.068, GHA Records)  - Recording: 2014
Mario Castelnuovo-Tedesco: 24 Caprichos de Goya (8.572252, Naxos)  - Recording: 2008
DEWA, Stefan Soewandi - Guitarworks II (double CD) (kr 10043, Kreuzberg Records); Dukic and other guitarists  - Recording: 1999
Tárrega, Antonio José, Bach, Takemitsu (1023-OPE, Ópera tres) - Recording: 1996
Printemps de la Guitare 94 (DMP 9522C, Plein Jeu) - Recording: 1994

References

External links
Audio recordings at Plushmusic

Croatian classical guitarists
1969 births
Living people
Academic staff of the Royal Conservatory of The Hague